The Hyundai R engine is a diesel 4-cylinder automobile engine produced by Hyundai Motor Group, it was announced during the Advanced Diesel Engine Technology Symposium in November 2008 and began production in 2009.

The R line of engines feature  four cylinders compacted graphite iron block and aluminum cylinder head unit, with chain driven dual overhead camshafts operating four valves per cylinder.

For reduced vibration and lower booming noise, the R gets a lower balancer shaft which is encased in a stiffened ladder frame housing for increased rigidity. Weight saving features include a serpentine belt with isolation pulley, a plastic head cover, plastic intake manifold and plastic oil filter housing.

To achieve Euro 5 emission compliancy, the R is fitted with a close-coupled Diesel particulate filter plus highly efficient exhaust gas recirculation with by-pass valve.

2.0 L (D4HA)

Applications
 Hyundai Santa Fe (2009–2020)
 Hyundai Tucson/ix35 (2009–2020)
 Kia Sorento (2009–2020)
 Kia Sportage (2010–2021)

2.2 L (D4HB)

Applications
 Hyundai Grandeur (2011–2019)
 Hyundai Palisade (2018–present)
 Hyundai Santa Fe (2009–2020)
 Hyundai Staria (2021–present; detuned) 
 Kia Carnival (2010–2020)
 Kia Sorento (2009–2020)

2.2 L FR (D4HC)

Applications
 Genesis G70 (2017–present)
 Genesis G80 (DH) (2016–2020)
 Kia Stinger (2017–2020)

See also
 List of Hyundai engines

References

External links

R
Diesel engines by model
Straight-four engines